Tetley's Super League VI was the official name for the year 2001's Super League championship season, the 107th season of top-level professional rugby league football in Britain, and the sixth championship run by the Super League. The season began on the first weekend in March and culminated after twenty-eight rounds in a six-game playoff series, involving the top 5 teams.

Rule changes
 20 metre restarts should be allowed to happen quickly and not be delayed by referees.
 The first and second halves will now end the moment that the hooter sounds, in the past referees could use their discretion to let play continue if they felt the siren had sounded in during play.

Refereeing focus
The play-the-ball was to be more strictly refereed:
 Penalising those teams that attempt to delay or interfere with the tackled player. Following a pre-season meeting with coaches the RFL's director of rugby, Greg McCallum, identified the following delaying tactics that would be monitored for: 
 "Flopping" onto the player tackled or pushing them down in a "second effort".
 Straddling the tackled player.
 Pulling at the tackled player's leg as they get to their feet.
 Making contact with the ball in the tackled player's arms.
 Putting a hand on the shoulders or head of the tackled player.
 Deliberately knocking into ball-carriers at play-the-ball.
 Team-mates of tackled players should not attempt to manhandle tacklers off the player in possession.  
 Attacking players must make at least an attempt to play the ball correctly with the foot. 
 Players "milking" penalties would be punished.

Rule deviation
The Rugby Football League opted to retain their existing substitution system of six changes from four available substitutes but allowing unlimited use of the blood bin. This put British rugby league at odds with international interchange rules and impacted preparation for international competitions.

Operational rules
 Match commissioners were introduced by the League as a first point of contact for clubs that wish to raise and issue resulting from a match. The introduction of this system follows a successful trial during the 2000 World Cup.

Table

Notes

Play-offs

Grand Final

The Grand Final, played on October 13 at Old Trafford, was won by Bradford Bulls who defeated Wigan Warriors to become champions. This was legendary Australian centre Steve Renouf's last game of top-level football before retirement.

References

External links
Super League VI at wigan.rlfans.com
Super League VI at rugbyleagueproject.com